Jason Danino-Holt (born 17 January 1987) is an Israeli television presenter and former MTV Europe presenter. He also presents "The Tube" on i24news English.

Life and career

Danino-Holt was born in Tel Aviv, Israel to a Moroccan French-Canadian mother, Chantal Danino, and a British father, Martin Holt. He was raised in a trilingual home and attended summer school in Cambridge at age 12.

He went to Teva School for Nature in Jaffa, followed by the Thelma Yellin High School of the Arts. Specializing in Theatre, he chose French, one of the three languages he spoke at home, as his other major subject. Unlike most of his Israeli contemporaries he did not serve in the compulsory draft to the IDF, which he states was for health reasons. In 2005, he was a Nickelodeon presenter in Israel. He is now based in London where he presents the MTV European magazine style show, Switched On. In 2007, he gave Israel's votes during the 2007 Eurovision Song Contest in Helsinki. He also presented a special show on IBA during Eurovision week this May, dedicated to the song contest.

In 2008 he came out as gay.

In May 2012 while interviewing the film director Peter Berg, Berg attacked him for draft dodging.

References

External links

1987 births
Jewish Israeli entertainers
Israeli people of British descent
Israeli people of Moroccan-Jewish descent
Israeli people of French-Jewish descent
Israeli people of Canadian descent
Israeli television presenters
Living people
20th-century Israeli Jews
21st-century Israeli Jews
Gay Jews
Israeli gay men
Israeli LGBT entertainers
Gay entertainers
People from Tel Aviv
Israeli LGBT broadcasters